The Charles Eliot Norton Professorship of Poetry at Harvard University was established in 1925 as an annual lectureship in "poetry in the broadest sense" and named for the university's former professor of fine arts.  Distinguished creative figures and scholars in the arts, including painting, architecture, and music deliver customarily six lectures.  The lectures are usually dated by the academic year in which they are given, though sometimes by just the calendar year.

Many but not all of the Norton Lectures have subsequently been published by the Harvard University Press.  The following table lists all the published lecture series, with academic year given and year of publication, together with unpublished lectures as are known.  Titles under which the lectures were published are not necessarily titles under which they were given.

Charles Eliot Norton Lectures

The post had no incumbent in years omitted.

External links
Article from Harvard Gazette naming 2006 lecturer (date later changed to fall 2006) and giving history of series
List of incumbents, 1926–2002, as reported by Harvard University's English Department (Dead link - see copy at the Wayback Machine)
Norton Lectures at the Mahindra Humanities Center at Harvard University

References

Harvard University
1925 establishments in the United States
Norton
Lecture series at Harvard University